St Peter's Church is a Church of England parish church in Caversham, a suburb of Reading in the English county of Berkshire. It is situated close to the River Thames in Caversham Heights.

History 

The church dates to 1162.

Royalists stationed troops in St Peter's Church during the Siege of Reading in 1643, and situated a cannon on top of the church tower. The Parliamentarians used artillery to destroy the tower. The church itself was also damaged in the process. The tower was initially replaced with a wooden tower. A south aisle was added in 1878, along with the present tower. It has eight bells, the oldest of which dates to 1637. Rectorial rights were restored in 1916.

References

External links

Saint Peters
Church of England church buildings in Berkshire
Saint Peters
Grade II* listed churches in Berkshire